"Chinese Wall" is the eleventh episode of the fourth season of the American television drama series Mad Men, and the 50th overall episode of the series. It aired on the AMC channel in the United States on October 3, 2010. Cara Buono, who played Dr. Faye Miller, received a nomination for Primetime Emmy Award for Outstanding Guest Actress in a Drama Series for this episode.

Plot
Ken Cosgrove finds out from an acquaintance at BBDO that Lucky Strike has left SCDP. The news spreads among the executives, resulting in a panicked emergency meeting. Roger Sterling, who has been hiding the impending disaster from his partners for weeks, fakes both an angry phone call to Lee Garner, Jr. and an angry visit to Garner's office. SCDP's executives tell the rest of the staff that Lucky Strike has defected as part of American Tobacco's cost-saving consolidation of accounts, but that client has praised the agency's work. The executives also assure the staff that more accounts are coming in than going out, and everything is OK; however, all expenses must be cleared through Lane Pryce or Joan Harris. Behind closed doors, however, Don tells the creative staff the firm is in trouble and charges them with protecting existing business and hitting home runs when pitching new business, while the partners and Accounts drum up new clients. Despite a few clients' jumping ship following the news (such as Glo-Coat), most stay, giving some hope for the future. However, the Accounts and Creative teams anticipate the worst. In the midst of the turmoil, Roger turns to Joan for comfort (which she provides, at arm's length, admonishing Roger that they cannot resume their affair), Megan seduces Don, Pete Campbell's baby girl is born, and Ted Chaough tries to recruit Pete, with Tom Vogel's encouragement.

Reception
The episode was viewed by 2.06 million viewers on the night of its original airing, while 0.6 million viewers in the adults 18-49 demographic watched the episode.

References

External links
 "Chinese Wall" at AMC
 

Mad Men (season 4) episodes
2010 American television episodes